The manga series Inuyasha was written and illustrated by Rumiko Takahashi and serialized in Weekly Shōnen Sunday from November 13, 1996, to June 18, 2008. The 558 chapters have been collected into 56 bound volumes by Shogakukan, with the first volume released in April 1997 and the final one in February 2009.

Viz Media licensed the series for an English translated release in North America. Initially, Viz released it in monthly American comic book format (page size 17x26cm, or 6⅝×10¼") under the title "Inu-Yasha[sic]: A Feudal Fairy Tale", with each individual issue containing two or three chapters from the original manga. Eventually, this system was abandoned in favor of collected volumes in trade paperback format, using the same chapter divisions as the Japanese volumes.

The first-edition series of Viz trade paperbacks retained the same title and subtitle but reduced the page size to approximately ISO A5 dimensions (14.5x22.5 cm, or 5⅝x8⅞"). After volume 12, the first-edition A5 series was discontinued. Subsequently, Viz issued new volumes and reprints of older volumes in the "Action Edition" second-edition format, with the simple title "InuYasha" and slightly smaller pages (12.8x19cm, or 5x7½").

On a quarterly schedule, Viz released the first 4 volumes, which covers the first 38 chapters, mirror-imaging the artwork to a "flipped" left-to-right format as standard in English-language works, as opposed to the right-to-left reading direction of Japanese. Volume 1 was released on July 6, 1998; volume 37 was released on April 14, 2009. On April 22, 2009, Viz announced that future volumes would be released in an unflipped format on a monthly schedule, starting with volume 38 in July 2009. However, reprints of the first 37 volumes have remained "flipped" instead of being reflipped back to right-to-left.

In 2009, Viz began to issue a third-edition set of paperbacks in their "VizBig" format, with three of the original volumes combined into each omnibus. These restore the page dimensions to the slightly larger size of the first-edition paperbacks, and also faithfully reproduce the occasional full-color bonus pages that were reduced to grayscale in previous printings. The eighteen volumes were released from November 10, 2009 to February 11, 2014. On December 15, 2020, Viz released all eighteen of these volumes digitally.

Viz Media also releases a separate series of "ani-manga" derived from full-color screenshots of the anime episodes, with dialogue and sound effects added in. These volumes are slightly smaller than the regular manga volumes, are oriented in the Japanese convention of right to left, feature new covers with higher quality pages, and are sold at a higher price point versus the regular volumes. Each ani-manga volume is arranged into chapters that correspond to the anime episodes rather than to the manga.

The chapter numbers listed below refer to the overall placement within the series. The Viz reprints have used several different renumbering systems; in the second-edition collections, the first chapter of each volume is indexed as "Scroll One", the second chapter is "Scroll Two", and so on, with the numbering reverting to "Scroll One" at the start of each new volume.

Volume List

Individual Editions

Volumes 1–20

Volumes 21–40

Volumes 41–56

3-in-1 Editions

Additional chapter

 is a special manga chapter published in Weekly Shōnen Sunday in 2013 for Shogakukan's Hero Comes Back manga anthology composed of short stories of their retired series, published to raise funds for the recovery of the areas afflicted by the 2011 Tōhoku earthquake and tsunami. The chapter was later included in the last volume of the wide ban Inuyasha reprint in 2015. In it, set six months after the last original manga chapter, Inuyasha and Miroku work as yōkai slayers. Kikyō sealed away a minor yōkai called Ne no Kubi before she first met Inuyasha 50 years ago. Ne no Kubi has escaped and seeks the Shikon no Tama. Inuyasha kills Ne no Kubi and Kagome is able to help him without outside spiritual assistance.

References

General

Specific

External links
Interview with English translator